The discography of Lisa Lopes, an American rapper and singer-songwriter, consists of two studio albums (one released posthumously), three singles and one solo music video.

Studio albums

Extended plays

Singles

Promotional singles

Collaboration singles

Music videos

References

Discographies of American artists
Hip hop discographies
Rhythm and blues discographies